In Euclidean geometry, the Erdős–Mordell inequality states that for any triangle ABC and point P inside ABC, the sum of the distances from P to the sides is less than or equal to half of the sum of the distances from P to the vertices. This solution was however not very elementary.

Barrow's inequality is a strengthened version of the Erdős–Mordell inequality in which the distances from P to the sides are replaced by the distances from P to the points where the angle bisectors of  ∠APB, ∠BPC, and ∠CPA cross the sides. Although the replaced distances are longer, their sum is still less than or equal to half the sum of the distances to the vertices.

Statement

(If the triangle is obtuse, one of these perpendiculars may cross through a different side of the triangle and end on the line supporting one of the sides.) Then the inequality states that

Proof 

Let the sides of ABC be a opposite A, b opposite B, and c opposite C; also let PA = p, PB = q, PC = r, dist(P;BC) = x, dist(P;CA) = y, dist(P;AB) = z. First, we prove that 

This is equivalent to 

The right side is the area of triangle ABC, but on the left side, r + z is at least the height of the triangle; consequently, the left side cannot be smaller than the right side. Now reflect P on the angle bisector at C. We find that cr ≥ ay + bx for P's reflection. Similarly, bq ≥ az + cx and ap ≥ bz + cy. We solve these inequalities for r, q, and p:

Adding the three up, we get

Since the sum of a positive number and its reciprocal is at least 2 by AM–GM inequality, we are finished. Equality holds only for the equilateral triangle, where P is its centroid.

Another strengthened version
Let ABC be a triangle inscribed into a circle (O) and P be a point inside of ABC. Let D, E, F be the orthogonal projections of P onto BC, CA, AB. M, N, Q be the orthogonal projections of P onto tangents to (O) at A, B, C respectively, then:

Equality hold if and only if triangle ABC is equilateral

A generalization

In absolute geometry
that the sum of the angles of a triangle is less than or equal to two right angles.

See also
List of triangle inequalities

References 
.
.
.
.
.
.
.
.

.

External links 

Alexander Bogomolny, "Erdös-Mordell Inequality", from Cut-the-Knot.

Triangle inequalities